1925 in Argentine football saw Boca Juniors winning its 5th. league title (AFA) while Independiente obtained the AAm championship, achieving the 2nd. title for the club.

Primera División

Asociación Argentina de Football  - Copa Campeonato

All Boys, Colegiales, El Porvenir, Nueva Chicago, Sportivo Barracas and Temperley moved to rival league Asociación Amateurs when most of fixtures had been disputed.

Alvear, Argentino de Banfield, Boca Alumni, Del Plata, General San Martín, Palermo, Progresista, Sportivo Balcarce, Sportivo Dock Sud, Sportsman and Universal were relegated when the associations merged.

Asociación Amateurs Argentina de Football
Talleres (RE), as the 1925 champion, made its debut in Primera División.

Lower divisions

Primera B
AFA Champion: Nacional (Adrogué)
AAm Champion: Honor y Patria (Bernal)

Primera C
AFA Champion: Libertad
AAm Champion: Racing III

Domestic cups

Copa de Competencia (AAm)
Champion: Independiente

Final

Copa Estímulo
Champion: Boca Juniors

Final

Argentina national team
Argentina took part in the 1926 Copa América hosted by Chile. The team finished 2nd. to Uruguay.

References

 
Seasons in Argentine football
1926 in South American football
1926 in association football